Valentina Trapletti (born 12 July 1985) is a female racewalker from Italy, who participated at three World championships and won seven national titles. She competed at the 2020 Summer Olympics, in 20 km walk.

Biography
She competed in the Women's 20 kilometres walk event at the IAAF World Championships of Berlin 2009 and London 2017. His best season was 2009, when she was 24 years old, was 6th at the Universiade of Belgrade and 16th at the World Championships in Berlin, setting up her Personal Best at the all two occasions. She also won two silver medals (in 2015 and 2017) in team rankings of the European Race Walking Cup. In 2018, she competed in the women's 20 kilometres walk event at the 2018 European Athletics Championships held in Berlin, Germany. She finished in 9th place.

Achievements

National titles
She won 8 national championships at senior level.
Italian Athletics Championships
10 km walk: road: 2016 (1)
20 km walk: road: 2009, 2015, 2017, 2018, 2022 (5)
5000 m walk indoor: 2020, 2021 (2)

See also
 Italian all-time lists - 20 km walk

References

External links
 

1985 births
Living people
People from Magenta, Lombardy
Italian female racewalkers
World Athletics Championships athletes for Italy
Athletics competitors of Gruppo Sportivo Esercito
Competitors at the 2009 Summer Universiade
Italian Athletics Championships winners
Athletes (track and field) at the 2020 Summer Olympics
Olympic athletes of Italy
Sportspeople from the Metropolitan City of Milan
20th-century Italian women
21st-century Italian women